Dominik Schlumpf (born March 3, 1991) is a Swiss professional ice hockey defenceman who currently plays for EV Zug of the National League (NL).

Playing career
Undrafted, Schlumpf played three seasons of major junior hockey with the Shawinigan Cataractes of the Quebec Major Junior Hockey League from 2008–2011, before returning to Switzerland and making his professional debut with the HC Lugano in the 2011–12 season.

During the 2016–17 season, while in his third season with Zug, Schulmpf agreed to a two-year contract extension through to 2019 on October 14, 2016.

Career statistics

Regular season and playoffs

International

References

External links

1991 births
Living people
EHC Basel players
SC Bern players
HC Lugano players
Ice hockey players at the 2018 Winter Olympics
Olympic ice hockey players of Switzerland
Shawinigan Cataractes players
Swiss ice hockey defencemen
EV Zug players